Sandro Theler (born 15 December 2000) is a Swiss professional football player who plays as a defender for Swiss Challenge League club Yverdon on loan from FC Sion.

Career

Early life and youth career 
Born in Brig-Glis, Switzerland, Theler began his career from the youth team of FC Sion, where he had featured for the clubs' under-21 division from 2016 to 2019.

FC Sion

2019-20 
Theler signed his first senior contract with the Swiss top-tier club FC Sion on 2019. He would represent for the club in the 2019-20 Swiss Super League season. Theler played his debut match for the club against FC Basel on 28 June 2020 as a substitute for Dimitri Cavaré on the 50th minute of the game, which ended 2–0 to Basel. Theler scored his debut goal for the club in his last match of the season against FC Luzern on 22 July 2020 in the 31st minute of the game. The match ended 1–2 to Sion.

2020-21 
Theler stayed with the club for the 2020-21 Swiss Super League season. Theler played his first match of the season against defending champions BSC Young Boys on 26 September 2020 as a substitute on the stoppage time for Dennis Iapichino. The match ended on a 0–0 draw. Theler played his Swiss Cup debut against FC Schötz on 12 September 2020 as a substitute for Batata in the stoppage time of the game which ended 0–3 to Sion.

Career statistics

References

External links 
 
 Sandro Theler at Swiss Super League
 Sandro Theler at FC Sion
 
 Sandro Theler at Eurosport
 Sandro Theler at Playmaker Stats
 Sandro Theler at Sofascore
 Sandro Theler at FOTMOB

2000 births
Sportspeople from Valais
People from Brig-Glis
Living people
Association football defenders
Swiss men's footballers
Switzerland youth international footballers
FC Sion players
Yverdon-Sport FC players
Swiss Super League players
Swiss Challenge League players